Rankin Independent School District is a public school district located in Rankin, Texas (USA).

Academic achievement
In 2009, the school district was rated "recognized" by the Texas Education Agency.

Schools
The district has two schools - 
Rankin High School (Grades 6-12)
James Gossett Elementary School (Grades PK-5)

Special programs

Athletics
Rankin High School plays six-man football.

See also

List of school districts in Texas

References

External links
Rankin ISD

School districts in Upton County, Texas